Kusumāsana Devi (died 10 July 1613), also known as , was ruling Queen of Kandy in 1581. She was deposed, but queen consort of Kandy by marriage to Vimaladharmasuriya I of Kandy from 1594 to 1604.

Life
In her infancy, she and her father Karaliyadde Bandara fled the kingdom to the Portuguese. Later she was baptised by the Portuguese and named .

Queen regnant
After the death of her father in 1581, the Portuguese installed her as a client ruler in the Campaign of Danture. She was at this point a teenager. She succeeded her father Karaliyadde Bandara as king of Kandy. The attempt was a disaster, with Portuguese forces completely wiped out. She was deposed by Rajasinha I of the Kingdom of Sitawaka in the same year she ascended the throne.

Queen consort
In 1594, she became the Queen Consort to Vimaladharmasuriya I of Kandy to solidify his rule after the defeat of King Rajasinhe I three years prior. Finally, she married her former brother-in-law Senarat who succeeded to the throne following the death of King Vimaladharmasuriya in 1604, also to solidify his legitimacy as ruler. Her ascendancy was contingent on converting to Buddhism, but she secretly taught Catholicism to her subjects during her life.

She had three children by King Vimaladharmasuriya - Mahastana Adahasin, Surya Mahadahasin and Santana Adahasin. She also had three children, Kumarasingha Astana, Vijayapala Astane and Deva Astane by King Senerath Bandara. Earlier she had a son, Prince Philip Jnr. from her first husband, Yamasinghe Bandara and died few weeks after birth. Mahastana Adahasin died in 1612 after six days of sickness. Her youngest son Mahastane later succeeded his father as King Rajasinhe II, known for the agreement with the Dutch to end Portuguese rule.

She fell sick after her son Mahastane Adahasin died in 1612, with her illness attributed to excessive grief by Philippus Baldaeus. She died on 10 July 1613 at the age of 35.

See also
 List of Sri Lankan monarchs

References

Citations

Bibliography

External links
 Kings & Rulers of Sri Lanka
 Codrington's Short History of Ceylon

16th-century women rulers
16th-century monarchs in Asia
House of Siri Sanga Bo
Monarchs of Kandy
Queens consort
Queens regnant in Asia
1613 deaths
Sinhalese queens
People of the Kingdom of Kandy
Catarina, Dona